Mario Tauzin (25 September 1909 – 31 October 1979) was an artist known for his erotic works published in 1930. He was born in Paris, France. His work was heavily influenced by Japanese Art.

External links
"The Devil's Whisperer"
Mario Tauzin at openlibrary.org

1909 births
1979 deaths
Modern artists
French erotic artists